Barber Glacier is a glacier rising just east of Mount Bruce in the Bowers Mountains and flowing north to the coast between Stuhlinger Ice Piedmont and Rosenau Head, Victoria Land, Antarctica. The glacier was mapped by the United States Geological Survey from surveys and from U.S. Navy air photos, 1960–65, and named by the Advisory Committee on Antarctic Names for Captain Don W. Barber, CE, USA, construction and equipment officer, U.S. Naval Support Force, Antarctica, 1967 and 1968. The glacier lies on the Pennell Coast, a portion of Antarctica lying between Cape Williams and Cape Adare.

See also
 List of glaciers in the Antarctic
 Glaciology

References
 

Glaciers of Pennell Coast